Mehrdad Karimian (born September 20, 1982) is a retired Iranian footballer and current coach. Mehrdad is the younger brother of Mehdi Karimian, a former player.

Club career

Club Career Statistics
Last Update 10 May 2013

 Assist Goals

External links
Persian League Profile

 https://www.youtube.com/watch?v=ydACiq1Y_Ks

1983 births
Living people
Fajr Sepasi players
Bargh Shiraz players
PAS Hamedan F.C. players
Sanat Mes Kerman F.C. players
Persian Gulf Pro League players
Azadegan League players
Iranian footballers
Association football midfielders
People from Bushehr
Shahin Bushehr F.C. managers